Gabrielle Bellocq (15 June 1920 - 29 July 1999) was a French Neo-impressionist pastel artist. She was known as a colorist, and her works, which were not painted from life, included a variety of colors that produced an unusual perspective and impressionistic effects.

Life and career 
Bellocq was born in 1920 in Saint-Hillaire-de-Talmont, a seaside commune in the Vendée department in the Pays de la Loire region in western France. She lived most of her life near the sea in this region.

Her mother taught her piano and singing and organized painting lessons with nuns at the Couvent de Saint-Sornin. She developed a passion for painting and was taught to copy others' work through her painting instruction.

As a boarder at school from a young age, she spent her time on Sundays between Sunday Mass, Vespers, and walks in the Vendée countryside. Throughout this period, she accumulated a library of images that she later reproduced in Neo-impressionist pastel paintings.

Around 1950, she came to live on the banks of the river Rance in a classic Malouinière, or manor house. She reproduced idealized versions of the house and nearby pond in her paintings.

In the 1960s, she abandoned watercolours and guache to concentrate solely on using pastels, which she would dedicate herself to for more than 30 years.

She exhibited worldwide, including in Paris, France; Windsor, Henley-on-Thames, and Salisbury, England; Osaka, Japan; Chicago, Illinois; Sedona, Arizona; and Ede, Netherlands.

She died in the summer of 1999 and rests in Saint-Briac-sur-Mer, France.

Awards 
Bellocq has been acknowledged by various European artistic institutions, including Salon des Artistes Francais, Salon d’Automne, and the Royal Academy of Arts. In 1978, the purchase by the French Ministry of Culture of her painting Ouverture sur l’océan (Opening onto the Ocean) for the National Collection confirmed Bellocq's stature as a prominent artist. Some of her significant awards include:

 1977 : Honourable Mention at the Salon des Artistes Français
 1978 : Prix Blanche Roullier
 1979 : Prix Marie Bashkirtseff, Prix Atrux-Beauclair de la Fondation Baron Taylor, Prix Blanche Roullier
 1980 : Médaille d’Argent du Salon des Artistes français, Prix Blanche Roullier
 1981 : Prix Raybaud
 1983 : Prix Blanche Roullier
 1984 : Médaille d’Or du Salon des Artistes français
 1987 : Grand Prix de la ville de Dinard

References

External links
 Official Website

1920 births
1999 deaths
French artists
Pastel artists